Calceostomatidae is a family of flatworms belonging to the order Dactylogyridea.

Genera:
 Bychowskya Nagibina, 1968
 Calceostoma Van Beneden, 1858
 Dicrumenia Mamaev, 1969
 Ktariella Vala & Euzet, 1977
 Paracalceostoma Caballero y Caballero & Bravo-Hollis, 1960

References

Platyhelminthes